MV St Clare currently sails on the Portsmouth to Fishbourne route operated by Wightlink. She was built in Gdańsk in 2001. From her introduction in 2001 until January 2004, St Clare was the longest ship regularly crossing between the Isle of Wight and the British mainland, but was overtaken by Red Funnel's Red Osprey following that vessel's stretching. 

St Clare can carry 878 passengers and 186 cars across three vehicle decks. All other vessels operating on the Portsmouth to Fishbourne route carry 771 passengers and 142 cars.

Her service speed is 13 knots, measuring 5,359 gt, with a length of 86 metres, beam of 18 metres and loaded draught of 2.6 metres. The ship has a double-end design, where the ship can travel in both directions, so that when it arrives, the vehicles are always facing the correct direction for disembarkation so she does not have to turn around before docking.

References

External links

 Wightlink website on wightlink.co.uk
 MV ST CLARE on faktaomfartyg.se
 ST CLARE on marinetraffic.com

Ships of Wightlink
Ships built in Gdańsk
2001 ships